Sypnoides is a genus of moths in the family Erebidae.

Species

Sypnoides amplifascia (Warren 1914)
Sypnoides chinensis Berio 1958
Sypnoides curvilinea (Moore 1867) 
Sypnoides cyanivitta (Moore 1867) 
Sypnoides delphinensis Viette 1966 
Sypnoides equatorialis (Holland 1894) 
Sypnoides erebina (Hampson 1926) 
Sypnoides flandriana (Berio 1954) 
Sypnoides fletcheri Berio 1958 
Sypnoides fumosa (Butler 1877) 
Sypnoides gluta (Swinhoe 1906) 
Sypnoides hampsoni (Wileman & South 1917) 
Sypnoides hercules (Butler 1881) 
Sypnoides hoenei Berio 1958 
Sypnoides infernalis Berio 1958 
Sypnoides kirbyi (Butler 1881) 
Sypnoides latifasciata Berio 1958 
Sypnoides lilacina (Leech 1900) 
Sypnoides malaisei (Berio 1973) 
Sypnoides mandarina (Leech 1900) 
Sypnoides missionaria Berio 1958 
Sypnoides moorei (Butler 1881) 
Sypnoides olena (Swinhoe 1893) 
Sypnoides pannosa (Moore 1882) 
Sypnoides parva Berio 1958 
Sypnoides picta (Butler 1877) 
Sypnoides prunosa (Moore 1883) 
Sypnoides pseudosabulosa (Berio 1973) 
Sypnoides rectilinea (Moore 1867) 
Sypnoides reticulata Berio 1958 
Sypnoides rubrifascia (Moore 1883) 
Sypnoides simplex (Leech 1900) 
Sypnoides vicina Berio 1958

References
Natural History Museum Lepidoptera genus database

Sypnini
Moth genera